Isidora Goreshter (born October 24, 1981) is an American actress. She is best known for portraying Svetlana on the U.S. TV series Shameless from seasons 3 to 8.

Early life

Goreshter was born and raised in Long Beach, California, where she began performing on stage at age three. She studied classical ballet.

Goreshter competed in gymnastics as a child. She earned first place in beam, second place in vault and floor, and third place all-around in her age group at the California State Cup Championship in 1992. Also in 1992, she came in second place overall in her age group at the Central Pacific Championships.

Personal life

Goreshter was the first member of her family born in the United States. Goreshter's family is from the former Soviet Union. Two of Goreshter's grandparents are from Orhei, Moldova.

Goreshter studied acting at the Stella Adler acting conservatory. She appeared in such stage shows productions as  Beirut, The Smell of the Kill, Waiting for Lefty, Laundry and Bourbon, and Waiting for Godot. She has degrees in theatre and art history.

Career

Goreshter made her film debut with a small role in the motion picture Paranoia, starring Harrison Ford, Gary Oldman and Liam Hemsworth. She then took supporting roles in the films T is for Twig, A Leading Man and the award-winning short Wonder Girls.

In 2013, Goreshter guest starred in the television series Shameless as the prostitute Svetlana. At first meant to be a short-term character, Goreshter became a series regular in 2016. She left after season 8.

Goreshter went on to a lead role in the motion picture the Petal Pushers and had a major role opposite Noël Wells and Joe Pantoliano in Happy Anniversary.

Filmography

Film

Television

References

External links
 

American television actresses
Living people
Actresses from Long Beach, California
American film actresses
21st-century American actresses
American people of Jewish descent
American people of Moldovan descent
1981 births